HMHS Ebani was a hospital ship serving the Allied forces during World War I. Ebani was originally a cargo vessel owned by Elder Dempster, one of the United Kingdom's largest shipping companies.  It was built in 1912 and was the second of its name.  It had a tonnage of 4,862 tons.
It was sold in 1938 to Italy and renamed the Maristella.

HMHS Ebani during World War I

Overview 

HMHS Ebani was used as a hospital ship for troops of World War I between 1914 and 1919.  The ship was manned by the Natal Medical Corps (NMC) of South Africa but also carried a British crew (see below). 
   
It was equipped for 300 or 400
patients but could carry 500 patients in an emergency.  A table of hospital ships during World War I gives the following statistics: 6 British Officers, 13 Nurses and Sisters, 36 RAMC & St Johns Ambulance etc., 508 cots.
A plaque at the Merseyside Maritime Museum records that over 5 years it steamed over 200,000 miles and carried 50,000 sick and wounded.

Acquisition and conversion 
At the outbreak of World War I voluntary workers provided a lot of assistance to the medical authorities.
A committee was formed, in Cape Town (South Africa), under Sir Thomas Smartt, to raise funds for the provision of certain auxiliary convalescent hospitals in the South African peninsular for both men and officers.
A search was undertaken for a vessel that could be used for hospital purposes only (as opposed to a transport of ambulances).  SS Ebani, a cargo vessel, was selected by the Senior Naval Transport Officer, Captain R.C.K. Lambert RN and by Colonel Stock to fulfill this purpose.

Smartt's committee chartered Ebani and converted it into a hospital ship for service in German South-West Africa.  It provided the funds and undertook the alterations and fitting out of Ebani as a hospital ship in accordance with the general specifications prepared by the director of medical services.
The ship was equipped as an hospital ship in Cape Town.  A staff was selected for the ship, the belligerent Governments were notified, and Lieutenant-Colonel D. Macaulay took over the duties of officer commanding.  As Ebani had been a cargo vessel for the West African trade, the decks were not unduly divided, and large airy wards with single-tier swing cots were prepared.  In addition to the fitted accommodation, a reserve of naval swing cots were carried.

The Natal Medical Corps 

The Natal Medical Corps was mobilized in 1914 and served in the South-West Africa Campaign.  During the campaign they formed the 6th Stationary Hospital at Swakopmund and manned Ebani.  The Natal Volunteer Medical Corps (NVMC) was formed in 1895 with the merger of the Durban Light Infantry, the Natal Mounted Rifles and the Natal Carbineers and is now known as the 1 Medical Battalion Group (1 Med).

British crew 

HMHS Ebani was intended to be a South African hospital ship to serve during the campaign in Africa.  However, there is evidence to suggest that there were insufficient South African volunteers to man the ship and British (and possibly other nationals) were required to man the ship.  A protest was lodged in the South African Medical Record on 28 July 1917. It was lodged by Medical Officers serving in German East Africa including Lt Col. D. Macaulay of Ebani.  The protest was against the number of able bodied and military aged South African men who were stay-at-homers.  This meant that the South African units had to be supplemented by men from the Royal Army Medical Corps (RAMC) to make up the numbers.

After World War I 

HMHS Ebani served as an hospital ship until 1919.  Following the end of the German South-West African campaign Ebani was transferred to Imperial authorities.  It continued to be used in various locations.  Any staff of the South African Medical Corps who remained on board following the transfer were themselves transferred to the Royal Army Medical Corps (RAMC).
It was sold in 1938 to Italy and renamed Maristella.
A third boat by the name of Ebani was built in 1952.

References 

Hospital ships in World War I
Ships of South Africa
Ships built on the River Tyne
1912 ships